Darko Anić may refer to:

 Darko Anić (chess player) (born 1957), Croatian-born French chess player
 Darko Anić (footballer) (born 1974), Serbian football player